Alois Schnorbus (born 12 January 1952) is a German bobsledder. He competed in the four man event at the 1980 Winter Olympics.

References

External links
 

1952 births
Living people
German male bobsledders
Olympic bobsledders of West Germany
Bobsledders at the 1980 Winter Olympics
People from Winterberg
Sportspeople from Arnsberg (region)